Elijah Pierson (30 August 1786 - 6 August 1834 ) was a successful American businessman and preacher who is best known for his later involvement with Robert Matthews ("The Prophet Matthias"). He was born in Morristown, New Jersey and was raised as a religious perfectionist Presbyterian, believing in God's direct interaction in the world in correlation to individual or collective sins.  Around 1800, he moved to New York City and began work as a clerk and later as a merchant. He remained unmarried, working on Pearl Street as a merchant, until 1822 when he met Sarah Stanford. The two were married and became heavily involved in mission work on Bowery Hill and Five Points, rejecting Yankee Presbyterian in favor of egalitarianism and retrenchment. After eight years of marriage, Sarah died from overwork, driving Elijah mad. During her funeral, Elijah attempted to raise her from the dead, declaring himself "Elijah the Tishbite". His distress over the will of God helped Robert Matthews persuade him to help fund his "Kingdom" in 1832. On July 28, 1834 in Sing Sing, New York, after eating several plates of blackberries, Elijah died of poisoning. Robert Matthews was accused and the case became extremely popular in the local penny presses.

References

1786 births
1834 deaths
People from Morristown, New Jersey
Christian revivalists
19th-century American businesspeople